Jean-Marc Gounon (born 1 January 1963) is a French racing driver. He is the father of fellow racing driver Jules Gounon.

Career
After winning the French Formula 3 Championship in 1989, Gounon moved into International Formula 3000 in 1990. He was the only man to win F3000 races in a non-Reynard in 1991 and 1992, in a RALT and Lola respectively. He also became known for his quick starts, and might have had another win at Enna in 1991, but was controversially adjudged to have jumped the start in the era before electronic detection.

In 1993 Gounon bought a two-race deal with Minardi after Christian Fittipaldi was dropped but he finished neither race, being withdrawn at Suzuka and spinning off in the season-closer, Adelaide's 1993 Australian Grand Prix.

The next year Gounon benefited from Andrea Montermini having broken his leg, and finished 9th for Simtek at his home race, France (Simtek's joint best ever result). He raced in seven grands prix that season and qualified for all of them, being finally replaced after the Portuguese Grand Prix by the better-funded Domenico Schiattarella, ending his F1 career.

Later in his career he went on to drive sports cars.

Racing record

Complete International Formula 3000 results
(key) (Races in bold indicate pole position; races in italics indicate fastest lap.)

† Driver did not finish, but was classified as he had completed more than 90% of the race distance.

Complete Formula One results
(key)

24 Hours of Le Mans results

References

Sources
Profile at www.grandprix.com

1963 births
Living people
24 Hours of Le Mans drivers
24 Hours of Spa drivers
ADAC GT Masters drivers
American Le Mans Series drivers
European Le Mans Series drivers
French Formula One drivers
French Formula Three Championship drivers
French racing drivers
International Formula 3000 drivers
Minardi Formula One drivers
People from Aubenas
Simtek Formula One drivers
Sportspeople from Ardèche
Aston Martin Racing drivers
DAMS drivers
Mercedes-AMG Motorsport drivers
Oreca drivers
David Price Racing drivers
Epsilon Euskadi drivers
FIA GT Championship drivers
Audi Sport drivers
BMW M drivers
Pescarolo Sport drivers